MICA Gallery is an art gallery located near the Cadogan Gardens junction on Pavilion Road, Knightsbridge, London, England. 

It was the first gallery in the United Kingdom to focus on modern Islamic art.

Description and nomenclature 
MICA is an abbreviation of Modern Islamic and Contemporary Art.

History 
The gallery was founded by Reedah El-Saie in 2007. It was the first gallery in the United Kingdom to focus on modern Islamic art.

El-Saie, is British-Pakistani barrister married to an Egyptian in London, and has used the gallery to promote the work of young British-Pakistani artists such as Nurjan, Khaver Idrees, Maaida Noor and Shafaq Ahmed.

Exhibitions 
In 2010, the gallery exhibited work by British visual artist Lateefa Spiker. In July 2011 the gallery hosted the recent Egyptian art exhibition From Facebook to Nassbook. The exhibition was dedicated to the memory of the Egyptian artist Ahmed Bassiony, who died in sniper fire during the 2011 Egyptian revolution. The same year, the gallery exhibited  calligraphy by Iranian artist Hamid Ajami.

Ashraf Fodais's 2012 installation Stones from Tahrir Square was described as "quietly and majestically thought-provoking" by Ben East, writing in The National. Also in 2012 the gallery hosted The Brit Pak exhibition of emerging British Pakistan artists' work.

References

External links
Official site

Contemporary art galleries in London
Buildings and structures in the Royal Borough of Kensington and Chelsea
Knightsbridge
Art galleries established in 2007
2007 establishments in England
Islamic art